Jiří Starosta (1923 or 1924 - 15 February 2012) was a Czech football manager who is last known to have managed Vítkovice.

Career

In 1959, Starosta was appointed manager of Ethiopia. After that, he was appointed manager of Sudan. After that, he was appointed manager of Cuba. In 1984, Starosta was appointed manager of Czech side Vítkovice.

References

Czech football managers
1920s births
Year of birth uncertain
Date of birth missing
2012 deaths
Expatriate football managers in Cuba
Expatriate football managers in Ethiopia
Expatriate football managers in Sudan
MFK Vítkovice managers
Ethiopia national football team managers
Sudan national football team managers
Cuba national football team managers
Czechoslovak expatriate football managers
Czechoslovak expatriate sportspeople in Cuba
Czechoslovak expatriate sportspeople in Sudan